Simonstone is a hamlet near Hawes and Hardraw Force within the Yorkshire Dales in North Yorkshire, England.

References

Villages in North Yorkshire
Wensleydale